Foxy Brown is the second soundtrack and the fifth studio album by American soul musician Willie Hutch, for the film of the same name. It was released in 1974 via Motown Records.

Reception 
Andrew Hamilton of AllMusic praised Hutch for "his distinctive tenor that wrung the most from each note" on "The Theme of Foxy Brown". Hamilton also praised "Give Me Some of That Good Old Love" as it "had a foot-tapping groove, tough backing vocals from Maxine Willard, Julia Tillman, and Carol Willis, and all the elements of a hit record". Meanwhile, "Out There" and Foxy Lady" was cited as nasty and contagious, albeit in a positive way. Besides that, Hamilton also cited that their most spirited performance was on "You Sure Know How To Love Your Man".

Reissue 
The album was reissued for the first time in 1996. It was reissued again in 2018 on standard-weight black vinyl in a faithful reproduction of the original packaging as it was released in 1974.

Chart performance 
The album peaked at No. 179 on the Billboard Top LPs chart and No. 36 on the Top Soul LPs chart.

Track listing

Personnel 
Adapted from Discogs.

 Vocals, producer, arrangements – Willie Hutch
 Guitar – Arthur Wright, Halbert Taylor, Tim Lawson
 Backing vocals  – Maxine Willard, Julia Tillman, and Carol Willis
 Keyboards – Nate Morgan
 Baritone saxophone – William Green
 Bass – Lawrence Dickens
 Drums – Abe Mills, Gene Pello
 Flute – Ernie Watts
 Saxophone – Carl Suttles
 Tenor saxophone – Bob Kee
 Trombone – George Bohanon
 Trumpet – Daniel Ackerman
 Vibraphone, tambourine – Gary Coleman
 Horns – A.D. Brisbois, Fred Jackson, Jr., Lew McCreary, Oscar Brashear, Plas Johnson
 Mixing engineer – Art Stewart

References 

1974 soundtrack albums
Motown soundtracks
Soul soundtracks
1970s film soundtrack albums